Daniel Kjell Rydmark (born February 23, 1970), is a Swedish former professional ice hockey player. He played during his career for VIK Västerås HK, Färjestads BK, Malmö IF Redhawks and Phoenix Roadrunners. He won three Swedish Championships during his career. One with Färjestads in 1988  and two with Malmö in 1992  and 1994 . He was drafted by the Los Angeles Kings in the 1989 NHL Entry Draft, as the 123rd pick overall. He never played with the Kings, but he played eleven games with Phoenix Roadrunners of the IHL in 1995.

Career statistics

Regular season and playoffs

International

External links

1970 births
Färjestad BK players
Ice hockey players at the 1992 Winter Olympics
Ice hockey players at the 1994 Winter Olympics
Living people
Los Angeles Kings draft picks
Malmö Redhawks players
Medalists at the 1994 Winter Olympics
Olympic gold medalists for Sweden
Olympic ice hockey players of Sweden
Olympic medalists in ice hockey
Phoenix Roadrunners (IHL) players
Sportspeople from Västerås
Swedish expatriate ice hockey players in the United States
Swedish ice hockey centres
VIK Västerås HK players